Alexander F. Schier (born 1964) is a Professor of Cell Biology and the Director of the Biozentrum University of Basel, Switzerland.

Schier received a B.A. in cell biology in 1988 from the Biozentrum of the University of Basel, Switzerland, followed by a PhD in cell biology in 1992 under Walter J. Gehring, also from the University of Basel, Switzerland. He conducted his postdoctoral research in Wolfgang Driever's lab at the Massachusetts General Hospital and Harvard University in Boston, US. In 1996, Schier was recruited as assistant professor in the Developmental Genetics Program to the Skirball Institute and Department of Cell Biology, NYU School of Medicine.

From 2005 to 2019, he was a professor at the Department of Molecular and Cellular Biology, Harvard University, Faculty of Arts and Sciences. In 2013 he became the Leo Erikson Life Sciences Professor. He chaired the Department of Molecular and Cellular Biology from 2014 to 2017. Since 2017 Schier is a site director of the Allen Discovery Center for Cell Lineage Tracing. In 2018, Schier became the Director of the Biozentrum of the University of Basel as well as Professor for Cell Biology.

Research
Schier is internationally recognized for his pioneering work on vertebrate development using zebrafish (Danio rerio) as a model organism. During his postdoctoral work, Schier and colleagues performed one of the first large-scale forward genetic screens in a vertebrate.

In his own lab, Schier has made fundamental contributions to the understanding of the molecular basis of vertebrate embryogenesis, including signaling, cell fate determination, cell movement, the maternal-zygotic transition, microRNAs, chromatin and non-coding RNAs. Schier's more recent interest in behavior has established  zebrafish as a model for sleep and behavioral research, determined neural circuits that underlie sleep identified small molecule sleep regulators and studied the roles of schizophrenia-associated genes REF Thyme Cell 2019.

He has contributed to the development of zebrafish as model system, including positional cloning, germ-line replacement to generate maternal-effect mutants, photobleaching and photo conversion, Brainbow imaging, brain activity atlas, small molecule profiling, transcriptomics and epigenomics, gene annotation, CRISPR/Cas9 genome editing, lineage tracing by genomic barcode editing and reconstruction of developmental trajectories by single-cell RNA-sequencing.

Mentoring
Schier is also well known for having an unusually high rate of placing trainees in academic positions. Previous mentees have gone on to PI positions at Yale, Princeton, Caltech, UCLA, University of Toronto, U Mass Amherst, NYU School of Medicine, University College London, MPI Dresden, University of Tokyo, UCSD, University of Calgary, MPI Tuebingen, IMP Vienna, University of Utah, Cambridge University and NIH. Key to his mentoring philosophy are five questions he has developed to sharpen the thoughts of his mentees:

Do you work on an important problem?
Do you work with sustained concentration?
Do you have a sense of urgency?
Are you able to troubleshoot?
Do you have the killer instinct to do the key experiments that will result in a coherent, conclusive and publishable study?

Awards
1999-2002             McKnight Scholar for Neuroscience
2001-2005             Irma T. Hirschl Scholar
2002-2005             Established Investigator of the American Heart Association
2006            		Harland Winfield Mossman Developmental Biologists Award of the American Asc. of Anatomists
2006-2008		McKnight Neuroscience of Brain Disorders Award
2014                      Everett Mendelsohn Excellence in Mentoring Award from Harvard's Graduate Student Council
2016                  NIH MERIT Award
2016                  Bjorkman-Strominger-Wiley Prize for Collaboration (with Florian Engert)
2017                  NIH Pioneer Award
2018                  Election to EMBO
2018                  Science “Breakthrough of the Year 2018”
2020                  ERC Advanced Grant
2020                  George Streisinger Award of the International Zebrafish Society
2020                  Election to National Academy of Sciences
2020                  Election to Academia Europaea
2021                  Fellow of the American Association for the Advancement of Science

References

External links
Schier lab website Harvard | Schier website Biozentrum
Harvard University MCB Department homepage
Harvard University MCB Department Faculty: Alex Schier 
Faculty of 1000

1964 births
Living people
Harvard University faculty
University of Basel alumni